Baitalpur is a town in Mungeli district, Chhattisgarh, India. A historic place since 1897, still serving and providing medical treatment for people affected by leprosy.
A Lepers asylum was started in 1897 by Rev. K. W. Nottrott, which is now The Leprosy Mission Trust India.

The Kaisar-i-Hind Medal for Public Service in India was a medal awarded by the British monarch between 1900 and 1947. It was awarded to
Reverend John Henry Schultz, who was the Superintendent of Chandkhuri Leprosy Hospital & Home Baitalpur, Acharya Vinoba Bhave on 28 January 1964. On 24 November 1933, Mahatma Gandhi also visited this place.

Geography

Location
Baitalpur is 30 km from Bilaspur. The nearest airport is Chakarbhatta Airport. Bilaspur Junction is the nearest railway station.

National Highway 200 passes through Baitalpur. Ghuthia is the nearest village.

References

External links
 About Baitalpur
 Satellite Image of Baitalpur

Cities and towns in Bilaspur district, Chhattisgarh